Nautilus Pipeline is a natural gas pipeline which gathers natural gas in the offshore Gulf of Mexico and brings it into Louisiana.  It is owned by Enbridge.  Its FERC code is 159.

External links
Pipeline Electronic Bulletin Board

Natural gas pipelines in the United States
Enbridge pipelines
Natural gas pipelines in Louisiana